Mathew Agama (born 2 January 2000) is a Ghanaian professional footballer who plays as a midfielder for Ghanaian Premier League side Ashanti Gold.

Career 
Agama played for GMC Academy in his initial days before moving to Obuasi-based team Ashanti Gold in September 2020 ahead of the 2020–21 Ghana Premier League. He made his debut on 25 February 2021, coming on at half time for Stephen Bentil in a 4–1 loss to Dreams F.C.

References

External links 

 

Living people
2000 births
Association football midfielders
Ghana Premier League players
Ashanti Gold SC players
Ghanaian footballers